Gare de La Rochelle is the main railway station serving La Rochelle. The station building, which includes a 45-metre-tall clock tower, was built in 1922 by Pierre Esquié for the CF de l'Etat replacing the older building. The railway station is well known for the "Danseurs au ballon" painted on the ceiling by Emile Sourice and Nicus Georget, 2 local artists. The station was renovated by Franck Beck and Luc Mouret in the early 1990s for the arrival of the TGV Atlantique.

La Rochelle is linked to Poitiers, Tours, Bordeaux and Paris as well as regional (TER) services to other towns in Nouvelle-Aquitaine, such as Angoulême and Niort. There are both TGV and TER rail services serving La Rochelle station.

The following train services serve the station as of January 2021:
intercity services (Intercités) Nantes - La Rochelle - Bordeaux

References

External links 
 
 Photograph from 1989

Railway stations in Charente-Maritime
Buildings and structures in La Rochelle
Buildings and structures completed in 1922
Railway stations in France opened in 1878
20th-century architecture in France